The 1967 Michigan State Spartans football team represented Michigan State University in the 1967 Big Ten Conference football season. In their 14th season under head coach Duffy Daugherty, the Spartans compiled a 3–7 overall record (3–4 against Big Ten opponents) and finished in sixth place in the Big Ten Conference.

Two Spartans were selected for the 1967 All-Big Ten Conference football teams. End George Chatlos received first-team honors from the Associated Press (AP) and second-team honors from the United Press International (UPI). Tackle Joe Przbyycki received second-team honors from both the AP and UPI.

Schedule

Personnel

References

Michigan State
Michigan State Spartans football seasons
Michigan State Spartans football